Juan Sebastián Cabal and  Robert Farah were the defending champions, but chose not to participate this year.

Ivan Dodig and Rajeev Ram won the title, defeating Nikola Mektić and Alexander Peya in the final, 6–3, 7–5.

Seeds

Draw

Draw

References

External Links
 Main Draw

Doubles